The BRICHOS family consists of a variety of proteins linked to major diseases, each containing a 100 amino acid BRICHOS domain that is thought to have a chaperone function.
These include BRI2, which is related to familial British and Danish dementia (FBD and FDD); Chondromodulin-I, related to chondrosarcoma; CA11, related to stomach cancer; and surfactant protein C (SP-C), related to respiratory distress syndrome (RDS).

Further reading

References

Protein domains
Protein families